Zazeran Rural District is a rural district (dehestan) in the Central District of Falavarjan County, Isfahan Province, Iran. At the 2006 census, its population (including Zazeran, which was subsequently promoted to city status and detached from the rural district) was 21,913, in 5,647 families; excluding Zazeran, the population (as of 2006) was 14,243, in 3,644 families.  The rural district has 6 villages.

References 

Rural Districts of Isfahan Province
Falavarjan County